Nathaniel Roache is a New Zealand professional rugby league footballer who plays as a  for the Manly-Warringah Sea Eagles in the National Rugby League.

He previously played for the New Zealand Warriors and the Parramatta Eels in the NRL.

Background
Roache was born in Auckland, New Zealand and is of Samoan and Irish descent. He attended Edendale Primary School in Sandringham then Balmoral Intermediate before studying at Mount Albert Grammar School.

His junior club was Richmond Rovers.

Playing career

Early career
While at Mount Albert he competed in the College Rugby League First XIII competition and the 2013 National Secondary Schools tournament, where he was named in the tournament's merit team. He played for the New Zealand Residents under-18 side in 2013 and 2014.

Signed by the New Zealand Warriors, in 2014 Roache made his Holden Cup debut for the Junior Warriors at five eighth. On 5 October 2014, Roache started at centre for the Junior Warriors in their 2014 Holden Cup Grand final against the junior Brisbane Broncos in the 34-32 victory. Early in the game he was shifted to hooker in response to an injury and received praise for his performance, which included setting up a try for Tuimoala Lolohea. 

Roache played in the 2015 and 2016 NRL Auckland Nines for the Warriors. In 2015 Roache was converted to play at hooker and signed to a two-year contract extension with the club.

2016
In Round 1 of the 2016 NRL season, Roache made his debut for the New Zealand Warriors against the Wests Tigers, playing off the interchange bench in the Warriors 26-34 loss at Campbelltown Stadium.

2017
In the 2017 NRL season, Roache made nine appearances as the club finished a disappointing 13th on the table.

2018
Roache made no appearances for New Zealand in the 2018 NRL season as the club qualified for the finals for the first time since 2011.

2019
Roache played six games for New Zealand Warriors franchise in the 2019 NRL season as the club missed out on the finals.

2020
In November 2020, Roache signed a developmental contract with Parramatta for the 2021 season after being released by the New Zealand Warriors.

2021
Roache began the year player NSW Cup coming off the bench, later starting at hooker. In round 15 2021, Roache made his Parramatta debut against the Canterbury-Bankstown Bulldogs at Bankwest Stadium.  During the match, Roache injured his knee and was ruled out for an indefinite period.

2022
After being released by Parramatta in November, Roache signed a train and replacement contract with Manly-Warringah.

References

External links
Parramatta Eels profile
New Zealand Warriors profile
Warriors profile

1996 births
Living people
New Zealand rugby league players
New Zealand people of Irish descent
New Zealand sportspeople of Samoan descent
New Zealand Warriors players
Parramatta Eels players
Richmond Bulldogs players
Rugby league hookers
Rugby league centres
Rugby league players from Auckland
People educated at Mount Albert Grammar School
Junior Kiwis players